In the early 2000s, LGBTQ+ representation in U.S. animation faltered, but expanded representation from animation aired in the 1990s or earlier. In this decade, series like Queer Duck, The Oblongs, The Venture Bros., Drawn Together, and Archer would air, along with various series which began in previous decades like The Simpsons, Family Guy, and South Park.

Trends
There was under-representation of gay characters through the Fall 2000 television season for all broadcast shows, with trend continuing until at least 2003. It would not be until 2005 that GLAAD would began their annual "Where We Are on TV Report" starting its continuing effort to compile statistics on characters in the LGBTQ+ community, and other marginalized groups. GLAAD, for their part, bemoaned the lack of LGBT representation. They noted in the regular 2006–2007 season, LGBTQ+ characters only comprised 1.3% of all regular characters on major broadcast networks (NBC, CBS, ABC, Fox, The CW, and UPN). In a report the next year, they noted in the 2007–2008 season, the FOX network only featured LGBT characters in animated comedies like The Simpsons and American Dad. In 2008, GLAAD assessed the "considerable" LGBTQ+ representation in animated primetime programming," citing shows such as The Simpsons, American Dad, Sit Down, Shut Up, The Goode Family, Rick & Steve: The Happiest Gay Couple in All the World, and Drawn Together,  even as they had their reservations about existing LGBTQ+ characters on television. In later years, GLAAD painted a bleaker picture, noting that no black LGBT characters were regular characters on television networks, again noting American Dad, The Simpsons, and Rick & Steve: The Happiest Gay Couple in All the World. They stated that most animated LGBT characters were on FOX, lamenting that while South Park historically had LGBT characters and storylines, it could be "hit or miss" like Family Guy.

Animation for adults
The 2000s saw various animated series targeted primarily to adults on Fox, FXX, Comedy Central, Adult Swim, and other platforms.

Fox and FX
A gay pedophile named Herbert was first introduced in the 2001 Family Guy episode "To Love and Die in Dixie. He was described by his voice actor Mike Henry as an "old man who likes Chris" and often makes "inappropriate, sexually tinged comments to teenage boys."

From June 2001 to September 2004, Braceface aired on Teletoon and the Fox Family Channel. The show included a secondary canon gay character named Mark "Dion" Jones.

In January 2002, The Simpsons continued teasing of the sexual orientation of Smithers as he rode a float called "Stayin’ in the Closet!" during the annual gay pride parade in Springfield in the episode "Jaws Wired Shut".

In April 2002, the King of the Hill episode "My Own Private Rodeo" featured gay characters who are a couple: Bug Gribble and Juan Pedro. The show also had Bobby Hill as a character interested in high-camp show business while Bill Dauterive wears "pretty dresses." The episode with Gribble and Pedro, entitled "My Own Private Rodeo",  which was nominated for a GLAAD Media Award.

In April 2003, The Simpsons episode, "Three Gays of the Condo" aired. It introduced a stereotypical on-and-off-again gay couple, Grady and Julio. Homer meets them when he moves into Springfield's gay district, after an argument with Marge. Later, after Springfield legalized gay marriage, Homer becomes ordained as a minister and marries Grady and Julio, in the episode "There's Something About Marrying", and talks about the segmented state of gay marriage in America in his speech as minister. Grady even tries to date Smithers as shown in the 2016 episode "The Burns Cage." At another point,

In July 2003, the Futurama episode "Bend Her" would air on FOX. While some praised this episode, Bender cross-dresses as a female robot under the name of Coilette to participate in the fembot league of the Earth 3004 Olympic Games where he claims five gold medals in the competition, other criticized it. 
 Critics argued hat the episode furthered the narrative that trans women are deceptive, coupled with the hurtful language and imagery" which surrounds the physical transition process Bender undergoes. The show also had one-time LGBTQ+ characters like Enos Fry and Old Man Waterfall who were killed off before the end of their respective episodes.

On February 6, 2005, the series American Dad! began airing on FOX. The series introduced Roger, a protagonist said to be pansexual, due to the fact he assumed different aliases and a carousel of seemingly-endless lives. A June 2005 episode, titled "Homeland Insecurity", of the same show introduced Linda Memari, an Iranian-American neighbor of the Smith family. She would later be shown to be a bisexual woman. The same year, the episode "Threat Levels" would introduce Greg Corbin and Terry Bates. They would be shown to be a gay couple and would be regular characters for many years during the show's run.

On February 20, 2005, Patty Maleficent, the sister of Marge Simpson, came out as lesbian in the Simpsons episode "There's Something About Marrying". She was described by animation and popular culture scholar Jo Johnson as a character, considered by the show, as a "netter candidate for 'outing' than Wayland Smithers," and that her lesbianism is explained by her "inability to find an eligible man in Springfield." At the end of the episode, she declares, after finding out the person she had been trying to enter a relationship with is a man, that she likes girls, which Johnson described as "subversive" move by the show. However, in the episode, when she came out as lesbian, her family initially didn't support her but they eventually came around and supported her. Some criticized her character as a "background gay character," but not like characters such as Ren and Stimpy in the cartoon of the same name which were confirmed as gay outside the show's universe.

In January 2006, a Family Guy episode, "Brian Sings and Swings", would feature featured a one-time lesbian character named Sarah who mistakes Meg's sentences as invitations to have sex.

In February 2006, in "My Fair Laddy", an episode of The Simpsons, Brunella Pommelhorst announces she is getting sex reassignment surgery.

In April 2006, in the Family Guy episode "You May Now Kiss the... Uh... Guy Who Receives", Jasper, the gay cousin of the series protagonist, Brian Griffin, is prominently featured.

From April to November 2009, Sit Down, Shut Up aired on FOX. In the show, one character, Andrew, is a flamboyant, and bisexual, Latino drama teacher whose last name in Spanish roughly translates to "he likes both", a reference to his sexual orientation. He is in love with Larry Littlejunk and Miracle Grohe, with whom he hopes to get into a relationship should they become a couple.

In August 2009, Stewie Griffin would be described by the creator of Family Guy Seth MacFarlane as "gay or a very unhappy repressed heterosexual."  A few years earlier, the Stewie Griffin: The Untold Story direct-to-DVD film, broadcast on the FOX network in May 2006, would have Stewie explore his identity. Some media critics noted the "cross-species marriage" between Brian's Cousin and a human lover, but stated that Stewie is the "most interesting" portrayal of homosexuality in the series.

In September 2009, Archer would begin airing on FX, and later FXX, beginning in 2017. In the first episode, Pam Poovey, the director of human resources, would first appear. She would later be shown as bisexual, with her voice actress, Amber Nash, in May 2019, in a behind-the-scenes feature calling Pam "a sturdy bisexual". The first episode also introduced Arthur Henry Woodhouse, Sterling Archer's personal valet, who is of ambiguous sexuality. He had a romantic and sexual attraction to another man, Reggie Thistleton, during the First World War, but it has not been specified whether he has ever had any sexual feelings for anyone since Reggie's death. Later his voice actor, George Coe passed away, the show did a tribute to Woodhouse, who later had a funeral, becoming a plot thread followed up on in the show's eighth season.

Adult Swim
From April 2001 to October 2002, The Oblongs, aired, first on The WB, then on Adult Swim. The series included a trans woman named Anna Bidet as a character.

The Venture Bros. began airing on Adult Swim in August 2004. In the show, Colonel Horace Gentleman was openly, and proudly, gay. However, he has an ex-wife, Mz. Quymn, as indicated in the episode "Dr. Quymn, Medicine Woman," and former a lover, Kiki, shown in the episode "Past Tense," who he lived with at his home in Tangiers, Morocco for years.

In December 2005, in the first episode of Moral Orel, premiered. One of the characters who appeared in that episode was Daniel Stopframe, a bisexual coach of Orel Puppington and the biological father of Shapey Puppington. Stopframe would later lust after the father of Orel and Shapey, Clay, and would even have sex with three women and a dog in the episode "The Blessed Union."

In February 2006, in the Moral Orel episode "The Blessed Union," Stephanie Foamwire-Putty first appeared. She would be a lesbian character in unrequited love with her old high school best friend, Kim Latchkey.

In September 2006, The Alchemist first appeared in an episode of The Venture Bros., where he began his on-again, off-again relationship with Shore Leave. According to the show creators, The Alchemist is gay in a way that is "just incidental" while Shore Leave is a very "openly swishy queer proud guy."

In the July 2008 episode of The Venture Bros., "Dr. Quymn, Medicine Woman," Virginia "Ginnie" Dunne, who is Dr. Quymn's bodyguard, is shown to be a lesbian who is trying to convert Dr. Quymn. She is also very masculine and a reported "man-hater.".

In September 2008, Superjail! first broadcast on Adult Swim. One of the protagonists would be Alice, a hulking and muscular head prison guard of Superjail and a trans woman who regularly engages in sadomasochistic rituals with the prisoners. Other characters in the series included  Jean Baptiste Le Ghei and Paul Guaye, inmates and a recurring couple as shown in the episode "Superbar" and others. In an interview with the creators of the show, co-creator Christy Karacas called them well-rounded characters, who are a couple, with Paul as more feminine and intelligent than Jean who is "the bad boy."

Comedy Central
In the June 2001, the South Park episode "Cripple Fight" premiered. In the episode, Big Gay Al is removed as Boy Scout leader because he is gay. However, even though his replacement is a pedophile he rejects the opportunity to retake the role, citing the rights of parents to protect their children from those they expect as friends, which some say proves that he will not confirm to "masculinist expectations and assumptions" and will remain a "Big (Queer) Al without apology or compromise." It is also pointed out, though that Al channels ideas of his heterosexual creators, and he was described as a "round, effeminate, oversexed, and scrupulously manicured dance hall queen" who acquiesces to the abuses of heterosexism.

In November 2002, in the South Park episode "The Death Camp of Tolerance," Mr. Slave would be introduced. The episode, which parodies enthusiastic support of minorities by "the heterosexual power structure," would be noted as implying that American culture has become "too liberal or too tolerant," and noted as treating a highly negative legend about gay people as true in order to justify "imposition of limitations on tolerance," even as the speech by Herbert Garrison could be interpreted as stating that the queer community shouldn't be accepted by the mainstream and should be left on its own to "ply its own music within a socio-political environment that does not discriminate or persecute." Literature and queer studies scholar James Keller would argue that Mr. Slave, on the other hand, is a gay S&M cliche and "leather queen" for wearing chaps, a leather vest over his bear chest, and a biker's hat, with a personality and speech patterns like hyper-masculine men, even as he lips every expression and is "more effeminate than Big Gay Al." Keller would also state that his gender identity is incoherent, but that he rejects Garrison after Garrison transitions, and even describes himself as "born a whore." He would be, for part of the series, Mr. Slave would be the boyfriend of Herbert Garrison. Mr. Slave is married to Big Gay Al, as of the episode, "Follow That Egg". The episode would be criticized for suggesting that politicians vote on their consciences rather than their constituency on controversial issues, that there is no scientific evidence on gay parenting, and the fact that Colorado does not recognize gender reassignment, as the sexually reassigned remain the gender of their birth.

Garrison, himself, would be, in the series, originally presented as a closeted homosexual. Storylines would feature Garrison coming out as a gay man, then having a gender reassignment surgery to become female (known as Janet Garrison), becoming a lesbian, and then changing back to a man. It is shown he still has feelings for his ex-boyfriend, Mr. Slave as shown in the episode "Follow That Egg!" One scholar argued that characters like Bugs Bunny and Mulan, who cross-dressed, paved the way for characters like Mr./Mrs. Garrison, described as a "post-op transgender character." Keller would argue that after Garrison transitioned to a woman, after which Mr. Slave turned to Big Gay Al instead, Garrison could embrace and deny his incoherent sexuality, claiming to be a real woman, and experiencing gender dysphoria. However, he would state that Garrison would engage in "borderline neurotic" before the transition, and be in a relationship with his longtime companion, Mr. Hat, who was chastised by Garrison for his "homosexual longings." He would also be noted as being viciously homophobia before coming out as gay, which some could see as dismissive of the reality of homophobia, and continuing to be homophobic after his transition, even leading a campaign to ban same-sex marriage in Colorado. Furthermore, it was noted that in the episode "Mr. Garrison's Fancy Vagina," his misapprehensions ignore the counseling processes required before someone has sex reassignment surgery, and his breasts are a subject or ridicule, with the monstrosity trope associated with him. As such, Keller argued that episodes such as "Mr. Garrison's Fancy Vagina," "Go God Go," and "Go God Go XII" imply that when someone embraces sexual reassignment it is a "slippery slope" which will lead humanity away from a "divine plan and result in an incoherent and godless future of internecine warfare." Garrison would also be described as "self-hating closet case who has a campy hand puppet named Mr. Hat."

The October 2003 South Park episode "South Park Is Gay!" satirizes The Queer Eye for the Straight Guy. However, it was criticized for containing a "potentially violent homophobic subtext," with Keller noting that while South Park does not have any more stereotypes than "The Queer Eye for the Straight Guy", it takes the idea of the show seriously, spreading gay tastes through the straight population, says that while the homophobia is muted by the fact that assailants are gay, it evokes "the sexual predator trope of the gay man who aggressively pursues and seduces straight men without taking 'no' for an answer." Even so, the episode was praised for rejecting sexual essentialism, and recognizing gender as a performance, not a biological inevitability. Additionally, the April 2004 South Park episode "Goobacks" focused on homosexuality, like other episodes of the series. However, it would be criticized for having a "socially reductive vision of homosexuality" and with incorrect sexual politics which relishes the slur that "homosexuality is inimical to procreation and subsequently the future of humanity" ignoring the lesbian baby boom, in vitro fertilization, surrogate motherhood, and test tube babies and other solutions sought by gay and lesbian couples which would like children. It would also be said that arguing that homosexuality can address environmental and social crises, could legitimize the contrary, and criticized the slur embodied in the episode that "homoerotic activity arises from an excess of lust."

In November 2004, in the Drawn Together episode "Xandir and Tim, Sitting in a Tree", Captain Leslie Hero forms a brief BDSM relationship with Foxxy Love. Hero is a "brawny classic cartoon superhero" who is sexually aroused, due to his erectile dysfunction, by an array of paraphilias and will have sex with anything and anyone. In a February 2006 episode, "Xandir and Tim, Sitting in a Tree," his gay alter ego Tim Tommerson, has an affair with Xandir. This Comedy Central animation, which aired from November 2004 to November 2007, would feature other LGBTQ characters as well. This included Ling-Ling, an Asian trading-card mini-monster, who is identified as bisexual by a parody of The Terminator in the episode "Wooldoor Sockbat's Giggle-Wiggle Funny Tickle Non-Traditional Progressive Multicultural Roundtable!" Some scholars criticized Ling-Ling for being a stereotypical Asian character. Foxxy Love, a "sexy mystery-solver," has relations with both men and women, but preferably with the former, including making out with Princess Clara in the show's first episode. Xandir P. Wifflebottom, a "young video game warrior," is labeled as a "totally gay video game adventurer" during the show's first episode, and is on a never-ending quest to save his girlfriend. In a November 2004 episode, "Gay Bash," he comes to terms with his homosexuality after having his arm bitten off by the Wood Beast, a creature that determines a person's sexuality by biting off the arms of homosexuals and keeping the arms of heterosexuals intact. In February 2006, the Drawn Together episode, "Xandir and Tim, Sitting in a Tree" aired. In the episode, Xandir has an affair with Captain Hero's gay alter ego, Tim Tommerson.

From October to November 2006, Freak Show, an adult animated series that centered on a superhero team called The Freak Squad, who also worked at a freak show, aired on Comedy Central. While the series only ran for one season, it featured a character named "Log Cabin Republican," a gay conservative whose superpower was called Burly Bear.

In March 2007, the South Park episode "Cartman Sucks" premiered, introducing a one-time character, Bradley. He would have a crush on another male character, Butters. It is also said that while this episode seems to be progressive, in that it shows that conversion therapy camps do more harm than good, its portrayal of this "essentializes sexuality and subsequently characterizes homosexuality as disorder or pathology," and as a genetic mistake and it suggests there is more injustice for non-gays than those in the conversion camps.

Other adult animations
In 2000, Queer Duck premiered on Icebox. The show became relatively influential after its premiere and later streaming on Showtime. It was the first U.S. animated TV series to have homosexuality as a major theme and was produced by Mike Reiss, a producer of Simpsons and The Critic. Both The Simpsons and The Critic had gay characters, with the latter having a long-running gag that the boss of the title character thinks the protagonist is gay, while the former had a raft of LGBTQ characters. It was received positively by some in the LGBTQ+ community since it had lesbian, gay, and bisexual characters. This included Adam Seymour Duckstein, the main character of the series. He is presented as a stereotypical gay duck and has been a victim of gay bashing. However, in the series finale, he wakes up to discover that he had sex with a woman. Steven Arlo Gator was Queer Duck's significant other, and latter married Queer Duck in a Jewish Wedding in Vermont in one episode, "Wedding Bell Blues." Melissa Duckstein, is Adam's sister, is occasionally revealed to be lesbian throughout the series. She is in a relationship with Yvette, in episodes such as "Homo for the Holidays," and the movie.

Clone High, which aired on MTV and Teletoon from 2002 to 2003, featured a gay couple: the foster dads of JFK, named Wally and Carl in Clone High. Two other characters, Phil and Chris would say they are gay lovers if it was "convenient."

From 2004 to 2009, Brother Ken appeared in bro'Town, which aired in New Zealand's TV3, principal of the school and is fa'afafine. The latter is a Samoan concept for a third gender, a person who is born biologically male but is raised and sees themself as female. Because the concept does not readily translate, when the series was broadcast on Adult Swim Latin America, a decision was made not to translate Samoan words and just present them as part of the "cultural journey".

In 2007, a friendly and flirtatious Vietnamese trans woman, who runs a salon, named Cherry Pie, debuted in The Nutshack, which aired on Myx TV.

Also in 2007, GLAAD described Rick & Steve: The Happiest Gay Couple in All the World, a stop motion animated sitcom on Logo TV as featuring the "only Filipino-American and gay lead character on television" at the time. The show would have a lesbian couple and two gay couples as characters. During the series, the gay couple Rick Brocka, a Filipino-American, and Steve Ball have a baby with the lesbian couple Dana and Kirsten. Chuck Masters and Evan Martinez are a male gay couple as indicated in episodes like "Mom Fight," with Chuck helping Evan with his drug addiction. Dana Bernstein and Kirsten Kellogg additionally have a baby with the gay couple, Rick and Steve.

Two lesbian couples (Mo and Trish, Souki and Jenn) appeared in a June 19, 2009 episode of ABC's The Goode Family, "A Tale of Two Lesbians". GLAAD praised this show, noting that Mo and Trish were recurring characters.

All-ages animation
The 2000s saw the premiere of all-ages animated series on Cartoon Network, Nickelodeon, YouTube, and other platforms, with LGBTQ characters. This included queer-coded characters in Time Squad, The Grim Adventures of Billy & Mandy, Static Shock, and W.I.T.C.H., along with an asexual character in SpongeBob SquarePants, a lesbian character in Lizzy the Lezzy, and gay and lesbian families in Dottie's Magic Pockets. Some argued that even by the early 2000s, there was virtually no media for those under the age of 12 with "explicitly queer" characters,

Cartoon Network

Time Squad which aired from 2001 to 2003 on Cartoon Network, arguably had an LGBTQ character. In 2012, the voice actor of Larry 3000, Mark Hamill, implied that Larry could easily have been interpreted as gay, due to his femininity and presentation as the "gay best friend" to Cleopatra in "Shop like an Egyptian", even though Larry has stated on multiple occasions he dislikes humans in general. However, the show never directly stated his sexuality. Even so, Hamill described Larry 3000 as "fierce" and "flamboyant."

In the August 2005 episode of The Grim Adventures of Billy & Mandy, titled "One Crazy Summoner", it was revealed that Dean Toadblatt and Squidhat, were gay lovers, marrying each other in the episode. One critic noted that while you could call them Cartoon Network's "first gay couple," it was actually Steven Universe, also airing on Cartoon Network, that "broke down representation barriers" years later.

In 2009, Rebecca Sugar pitched her seven-minute short for a show called Steven Universe to Cartoon Network, a show which would premiere many years later. In 2010, Sugar began working on Adventure Time, starting to change CN's then-focus on "boys" programming, even during a pitch meeting for Steven Universe the year before.

Other all-ages animations

From 2000 to 2004, Static Shock aired on Kids' WB. On September 23, 2000, Richard "Richie" Osgood Foley, best friend of Static/Virgil, Richie, also known as Gear, was introduced. He was based on an openly gay character named Rick Stone from the original comic. Dwayne McDuffie, one of the show's creators, said he dealt with the homosexuality of Richie by writing him "aggressively and unconvincingly announcing his heterosexuality whenever possible...while Virgil rolled his eyes at the transparency of it" but it never came up in the show because it was rated Y-7.

A Flash animated web series, Gotham Girls, which aran from 2000 to 2002, focused on several of the female characters of Gotham City. In some of the episodes, a character named Selma Reesedale, a detective who works for the Gotham PD, appeared. It is later revealed she is a trans woman, which Batgirl discovers, and she later helps Batgirl as a result. Batgirl is one of the only characters who knows Selma's secret. She is possibly the first trans sci-fi character to appear in any "superhero production."

In October 2002, in response to criticism from Christian fundamentalists, Stephen Hillenburg, series creator for SpongeBob SquarePants, described SpongeBob as asexual, not gay. He repeated this in 2005 when Focus on the Family, a Christian fundamentalist organization, claimed that SpongeBob SquarePants was "homosexual propaganda." Years later, it was revealed that Hillenburg instructed those working on the show that SpongeBob should never have a romantic relationship, since he is asexual (as all real-life sea sponges are) and is too innocent for it. SpongeBob would later appear in The SpongeBob SquarePants Movie (2005), The SpongeBob Movie: Sponge Out of Water (2015), and The SpongeBob Movie: Sponge on the Run (2020/2021). One scholar argued that characters like SpongeBob SquarePants challenged the "signifiers of traditional masculinity," and noted that Spongebob was "primarily asexual," but has a traditional wardrobe, and his design uses masculine and feminine signifiers at the same time. Johnson also noted that Spongebob can fluctuate between "masculine aggression and...feminine positivity," has gender ambiguity like Jerry, and Bugs Bunny.

From December 2004 to December 2006, W.I.T.C.H. aired on ABC Kids, ABC Family, and Toon Disney, along with France 3 in France. In April 2016, Greg Weisman, the producer of Season 2, said that Irma is a lesbian, only interested in "guys that are obviously out of reach," trying to be straight, but by doing this, she is "guaranteeing that she won't have to actually wind up with a guy" and when she comes close, she "comes close to landing one of them, she bolts." Even so, he left it open to interpretation, saying that this doesn't make it "impossible for her to be straight or bisexual or whatever." Weisman also said that Nerissa was Cassidy's lover, killing each other when they were in a romantic relationship with one another. Both began a relationship, in Weisman's words, after spending a lot of time together as teammates, and said that she "loved and mourned Cassidy." Even so, Weisman did not correct a fan when they described Nercissa as bisexual. Weisman also said that Cassidy and Nerissa were in a relationship when Nerissa killed her.

In 2006, Lizzy the Lezzy premiered on Myspace, including LGBTQ+ characters like Lizzy, a lesbian. The show would later air on YouTube.

In  September 2007, Dottie's Magic Pockets became the first available show for children in gay and lesbian families.

In February 2021, Ralph Farquhar revealed that in The Proud Family, which aired on the Disney Channel from 2001 to 2005, they had to use "code to talk about if Michael was gay, to talk about sexuality" and to be "sort of underhanded about it." He said this changed with The Proud Family: Louder and Prouder with the biggest changes to the show ere "gender identity, obviously racial identity and quote-unquote wokeness,” and said that sexuality can be "sort of in your face with it a lot more," manifesting itself in the storytelling.

Animated films
In 2003, Lynne Fernie completed Apples and Oranges, a film which was part animation, part documentary, for children of an elementary school age. It addressed issues of bullying and homophobia. It was produced by the National Film Board of Canada, with Fernie as director, and Tamara Lynch as producer. In the first segment, "Anta's Revenge," Anta, her two moms, and all-girl band work together to overcome a bully. In the second segment, "Defying Gravity," Habib and Jeroux, two skateboarders, deal with homophobia after Jeroux comes out as gay.

In 2004, a 10-minute animated short titled John and Michael premiered in Canada. The film focuses on two men with Down's syndrome, John and Michael share a loving relationship.

In June 2007, the film animated biographical drama film titled Persepolis, based upon Marjane Satrapi's  autobiographical graphic novel of the same name, would premier in France. In the film, Marjane lives for some time in a communal apartment with eight gay men in Vienna, Austria. Also, in the film, Marjane's boyfriend Fernando (named Enrique in the comic) reveals to her that he is gay. He thanks her because she helped him to discover his own sexuality. He states that if a relationship with her does not work out, it would not work with any other girl.

In June 2008, Futurama: The Beast with a Billion Backs, a direct-to-video animated science-fiction comedy-adventure film based on the animated series Futurama, was released. In the film, Colleen O'Hallahan is polyamorous snce she has five boyfriends: Fry, Chu, Ndulu, Schlomo and Bolt Rolands. After Yivo, a planet-sized alien with no determinable gender, the planet-sized alien, dates, marries and breaks up with all people of the universe at once, she remains in a relationship only with Yivo. Some have said that Yivo may have been "the first non-binary character defined as such in animated history."

In February 2009, Coraline, a stop-motion animated dark fantasy horror film, began showing in theaters. In the film, April Spink, a retired burlesque dancer who may know about magic and fairies, and Miriam Forcible, another retired burlesque actress, are lovers. On multiple occasions, Neil Gaiman, who wrote the 2002 novel the movie is based on, stated that they are an elderly couple and are together, relating to the many lesbians he put in his other works like Sandman, Death: The Time of Your Life, Neverwhere, American Gods, and Miracleman. He also confirmed that this was reflected in the movie, noting a review on the movie in 2009, stating that they had been called "thespians" in a Coraline musical in 2007, and stated that he did not call them a couple in the text because he wanted readers to have the same experience he had "with the couple that Spink and Forcible were based on."

On April 9, 2009, Mary and Max, a stop-motion adult-animated comedy-drama film, began showing in Australia. One character, Damien Popodopoulos, a funny man who stutters, leaves his wife Mary, who was previously his neighbor, to be with his male pen friend in New Zealand. The two enter into a relationship.

Timeline of key events
 October 9, 2002:  Stephen Hillenburg, creator of SpongeBob SquarePants, says that SpongeBob is not gay, but is asexual.
 August 7, 2004: The Venture Bros. begins airing on Adult Swim. It would include LGBTQ characters like Colonel Horace Gentleman.
 September 22, 2004: bro'Town begins its run on TV3. In the show, Brother Ken would be a fa'afafine, a Samoan concept for a third gender.
 October 27, 2004: Drawn Together begins airing on Comedy Central. It will feature, during its three-year run, a number of LGBTQ characters, some of which are in the show's main cast like Captain Leslie Hero and Foxxy Love.
 February 6, 2005: American Dad! began airing on Fox, introducing Roger, a pansexual protagonist.
 June 24, 2008: Futurama: The Beast with a Billion Backs is released on DVD to those in the United States and Canada. One character in the film, Yivo, is a planet-sized alien with no determinable gender, and would be described as the first non-binary character "defined as such"  in the history of animation.
 September 17, 2009: Archer begins airing on FX. The series would feature various LGBTQ characters.

See also
 LGBT representation in animated web series
 LGBT representation in American adult animation
 LGBT children's television programming
 List of animated series with LGBT characters
 History of homosexuality in American film
 History of anime
 Media portrayals of bisexuality
 Media portrayal of lesbianism
 List of LGBT-related films by year
 Cross-dressing in film and television
 List of animated series with crossdressing characters
 List of anime by release date (1946–1959)

References

Citations

Sources 
 
 
 
  
 
 
 
 
 
 
 
 
 
  See the overview page here.
 

2000s animated television series
Animated television series
LGBT portrayals in mass media
2000s LGBT-related mass media
LGBT characters in animation